Gerard Hendrik Slotemaker de Bruïne (29 January 1899, in Beilen – 27 December 1976, in The Hague) was a Dutch politician.

References
 SLOTEMAKER DE BRUINE, Gerardus Hendricus (1899-1976) in the Biografisch Woordenboek van Nederland.

1899 births
1976 deaths
Dutch civil servants
Dutch resistance members
Labour Party (Netherlands) politicians
Members of the House of Representatives (Netherlands)
Pacifist Socialist Party politicians
Party chairs of the Netherlands
People from Midden-Drenthe
Utrecht University alumni